The Waynesville Engine House and Lockup, at 260 Chapman St. in Waynesville, Ohio, was built in 1881.  It was listed on the National Register of Historic Places in 1999.  It has also been known as the Waynesville Lockup.

It was built in 1881 as Waynesville's first fire station.  A fire truck was purchased in 1886, and in the same year an extension to the rear was added to serve as a jail.

It is not covered in the Ohio Historic Places Dictionary.

References

Fire stations on the National Register of Historic Places in Ohio
Jails on the National Register of Historic Places in Ohio
National Register of Historic Places in Warren County, Ohio
Neoclassical architecture in Ohio
Fire stations completed in 1881
1881 establishments in Ohio